

Medal summary

Medal table

Men's events

References

1963
1963 Pan American Games
Rowing competitions in Brazil